

Box office collection
The top films released in 2015 by worldwide box office gross revenue are as follows:

Telugu films released in the year 2015.

Released January 2015 – June 2015

Released July 2015 – December 2015

Dubbed films

Notable deaths

References 

2015
Telugu
Telugu